The Belvedere of Spreading Righteousness (Manchu:  jurgan be selgiyere asari) is a building in Forbidden City's Outer Court, in Beijing, China.

References

External links

 

Buildings and structures in Beijing
Forbidden City